The 29th South American Junior Championships in Athletics were held in San Carlos, Uruguay from June 20–21, 1997.

Participation (unofficial)
Detailed result lists are available on the "World Junior Athletics History" website.  An unofficial count yields the number of about 302 athletes from about 11 countries:  Argentina (59), Bolivia (3), Brazil (65), Chile (32), Colombia (21), Ecuador (22), Panama (1), Paraguay (22), Peru (15), Uruguay (38), Venezuela (24).

Medal summary
Medal winners are published for men and women
Complete results can be found on the "World Junior Athletics History" website.

Men

Women

Medal table (unofficial)

References

External links
World Junior Athletics History

South American U20 Championships in Athletics
1997 in Uruguayan sport
South American U20 Championships
International athletics competitions hosted by Uruguay
1997 in youth sport